Guy Vanhengel (born 10 June 1958) is a Flemish politician for the Flemish Liberals and Democrats (VLD).

Vanhengel graduated (1979) as a teacher and taught class until 1981. After his army service (1981–1982) he started working as a spokesperson to the then secretary of state Annemie Neyts. A few years later, when Guy Verhofstadt first became the party leader for the liberals, he moved on to spokesperson of the party PVV (1984–1985). When Verhofstadt is called to become vice-premier he takes Vanhengel with him to work on his staff (1985–1988). In 1988 Guy Vanhengel became manager of Tourism Flanders and was then sent on secondment with the cabinet of Patrick Dewael who held the office of minister of Cultural Affairs (1988–1989). From 1989 to 1995 Vanhengel returned to being party spokesperson of the PVV (later VLD).

In 1995 Vanhengel turned member of the Brussels Parliament, later to become minister in the Brussels government (2000) annex minister in the Flemish Community Commission - Vlaamse Gemeenschapscommissie and the Common Community Commission -Gemeenschappelijke Gemeenschapscommissie.

When Bert Anciaux left the Flemish Government it was imperative that someone from Brussels took over. Vanhengel was the man for the job and for a couple of months (2002–2003)held a post in both the Brussels and the Flemish Government.

In July 2009 Vanhengel became "vice-premier minister" and minister of budget in de Federal Belgian Government.
In Juin 2010 he turned member of the Federal Parliament.

Political curriculum

 Member of the Brussels Parliament (1995-2000)
 President of the Council of the Flemish Community Commission - Vlaamse Gemeenschapscommissie (1999–2000)
 Brussels Minister of Finance, Budget, Civil Affairs and External Relations in the Brussels Regional Government (2000–2004)
 Councilor with the competence of Education, Vocational Training and Budget in the Flemish Community Commission (2000–2004)
 Councilor with the competence of Social Security and Civil Office in the Common Community Commission - Gemeenschappelijke Gemeenschapscommissie (2000–2004)
 Flemish minister of Sport and Brussels Institutional Affairs(2002–2003)
 Brussels-Capital Region Minister of Finance, Budget, External Relations and IT (2004–2009)
 President of the Council of the Flemish Community Commission - Vlaamse Gemeenschapscommissie, with the competence of Education, Vocational Training, Budget and Media Policies (2004–2009)
 Minister with the competence of Health and Budget in the Common Community Commission - Gemeenschappelijke Gemeenschapscommissie (2004–2009)
 Vice-premier and Minister of Budget in the Belgian Government (July 2009-December 2011)
 Brussels Minister of Finance and Budget (December 2011–July 2019)
Member of the Brussels Parliament (2019– )

Honours 
 26 mei 2014: Grand Officer Order of Leopold.

Mandates and functions
 Information Officer Radio Contact (1979–1982)
 Collaborator of Het Laatste Nieuws (1979–1988)
 Boardmember of NV Brusselse Huisvestingsmaatschappij (1985–1995)
 Boardmember of BRTN (1992–1995)
 Boardmember of NV VAR (1994–1995)
 OCMW councillor in Evere (1983–1989)
 Local Councillor in Evere (1989-...)
 Secretary of the Bureau of the Brussels Capital Council (1995–2000)
 President of the Flemish Community Commission - Vlaamse Gemeenschapscommissie (VGC) (1999–2000)
 Minister in the Brussels-Capital Region Government (2000-     )
 Member of the Flemish Community Commission - Vlaamse Gemeenschapscommissie, competence Education and Budget (2000–2004)
 Chairperson of the Flemish Community Commission - Vlaamse Gemeenschapscommissie, competence Education and Budget (2004- )

See also
List of foreign ministers in 2017
List of current foreign ministers

References

1958 births
Living people
Politicians from Brussels
Open Vlaamse Liberalen en Democraten politicians
21st-century Belgian politicians